Jason Smith (born Atlanta) is a retired American soccer player and coach.

Player
Smith attended Kennesaw State University and Truett-McConnell College where he was an honorable mention (third team) All American his sophomore season.  He  then spent six seasons in SISL, renamed the USISL in 1991, from 1989 to 1993.  In 1989, Smith signed with the Atlanta Express.  In 1990, he moved to the Georgia Steamers for the 1990–1991 SISL indoor season.  The Steamers became the Atlanta Quicksilver for the 1991 SISL outdoor season and the Atlanta Lightning for the 1991–1992 SISL indoor season.  In the fall of 1991, he joined the Tulsa Ambush of the National Professional Soccer League.  The team lasted one season.

Coach
In 1993, Smith became the head coach of both the men's and women's soccer teams at Piedmont College.  Over the next twelve seasons, he compiled a combined 275-162-15 record.  On June 13, 2005, the Atlanta Silverbacks of the USL First Division hired Smith as head coach.  He coached the Silverbacks through the 2008 season.  In 2010, Smith became the head coach of Pfeiffer University. In 2014, Smith again became the head coach of the Atlanta Silverbacks.

External links
 Atlanta Silverbacks Coach Profile
 Pfeiffer University: Jason Smith

References

Living people
Year of birth missing (living people)
American soccer coaches
American soccer players
Georgia Steamers players
National Professional Soccer League (1984–2001) players
Tulsa Ambush players
USL First Division coaches
USISL players
Atlanta Silverbacks coaches
North American Soccer League coaches
Association footballers not categorized by position